Héctor Ricardo "Ricky" Aramendi Rueda (born March 27, 1937) is a retired Argentinian-born Spanish footballer who played for Xerez in 1966 until 1967. He played for his first club Club Atlético Huracán in 1955 until 1959. He was a forward.

Career 

He began playing his career in 1955 for playing Huracán. He played for the club until 1959, that year when he moved to Spain to join staff of Real Valladolid when terminated his contract in 1964, he signed by the RCD Mallorca, where remains until 1966. In 1967 Hector Aramendi was on the campus of Xerez, where he finally retired professional football and ended his career at age of 30.

References 

1937 births
Living people
Argentine footballers
Spanish footballers
Xerez CD footballers
Footballers from Buenos Aires
Spanish emigrants to Argentina
Association football forwards

es:Héctor Aramendi